Ethalaya is a 2020 Sri Lankan Sinhala action film directed by Nalaka Vithanage and co-produced by Dan Wijeratne with Kelum Aryan Kularatne for NK Films. It stars Kelum Kularatne, Chamathka Lakmini and newcomer Shehani Perera in lead roles whereas Gayathri Dias, Rex Kodippili and Shyam Fernando made supportive roles. Shehani is the younger sister of popular film actress Udari Perera.

The screening of the film halted due to prevailing COVID-19 pandemic in Sri Lanka. However, the film halls were reopened from 27 June 2020 and the film was re-released in film theaters. However, the producer Kelum Aryan expressed the injustice occurred during the screening of the film in the rescheduled period.

Plot

Cast
 Kelum Kularatne as Suraj 
 Shehani Perera
 Chamathka Lakmini as Ayanthi
 Rex Kodippili
 Shyam Fernando as Minister Lakshman Suranimala 
 Gayathri Dias
 Dharmapriya Dias
 Teddy Vidyalankara

Soundtrack
The film consists with three songs.

References

External links
 
 Trailer of Eethalaya on YouTube

2020 films
2020s Sinhala-language films